Garden City High School is the public high school in the Incorporated Village of Garden City in the Town of Hempstead, New York, United States.  In 2016 Garden City High School was ranked the #121 school in the nation by U.S. News & World Report.

As of the 2018–19 school year, the school had an enrollment of 1,188 students and 94.5 classroom teachers (on an FTE basis), for a student–teacher ratio of 12.6:1. There were 46 students (3.9% of enrollment) eligible for free lunch and 4 (0.3% of students) eligible for reduced-cost lunch.

Notable alumni
Academia
 Gilbert Chu, biochemist and oncologist at Stanford University
 R. Inslee Clark Jr., Dean of undergraduate admissions, Yale University

Arts
 Liza Huber, actress and daughter of Susan Lucci
 Joe Iconis, musical theater writer; recipient of 2006 Jonathan Larson award, 2007 Ed Kleban award, and a Backstage Bistro Award
 Susan Lucci, actress, star of All My Children, class of 1964
 Elliott Murphy, singer/songwriter, class of 1967
 John Tesh, pianist, composer

Broadcast journalism
 Lara Spencer, television journalist, co-anchor of Good Morning America, class of 1987
 John Tesh, radio host and television presenter

Finance
 John J. Phelan Jr., former chairman and chief executive officer of the New York Stock Exchange

Government
 Michael Balboni, former deputy secretary for Public Safety for the State of New York, New York State Senator and Assemblyman
 Steven Chu (born 1948), former U.S. Secretary of Energy and winner of the Nobel Prize in Physics in 1997, class of 1966
 John R. Dunne, former U.S. Assistant Attorney General for Civil Rights and New York State Senator
 Kashyap "Kash" Patel, attorney, Congressional aide, and federal government official
 Kathleen Rice, U.S. Representative for New York's 4th congressional district and former district attorney of Nassau County, New York

Literature
 Sarah Langan, horror writer, class of 1992
 Sarah Smith, author of mysteries and science fiction

Science
 Gilbert Chu, biochemist and oncologist at Stanford University
 Michael Wigler, geneticist at Cold Spring Harbor Laboratory

Sports
 Carl Braun, professional basketball player for the New York Knicks
 Matt Daley, New York Yankees relief pitcher
 Dave Jennings, NFL punter and football analyst
 Don McCauley, All-American running back at North Carolina, Baltimore Colts, College Football Hall of Fame

Miscellaneous
John Chatterton, commercial scuba diver, subject of the bestselling book Shadow Divers

Notable faculty
 Irvin Faust, noted novelist and short-story writer; director of guidance, 1960–1995

References

External links 
 
 Garden City High School website
 Photographs from Garden City High School sporting events 
 Garden City Wings ice hockey team

Public high schools in New York (state)
Garden City, New York
Schools in Nassau County, New York